Azerbaijan University of Architecture and Construction (AUAC) is a state university located in Baku, Azerbaijan, specializing in civil engineering and architecture. The university was established in 1975 as spin-off from the Azerbaijan Technical University, named Azerbaijan Civil Engineering Institute.

History 
AUAC started out in 1920 as a Construction faculty within the Baku Polytechnic Institute. In 1930–34, AUAC operated as independent Construction and Architecture Institute, from 1934 as a faculty in the Azerbaijan Industrial Institute, and from 1951 as a faculty in the Azerbaijan Technical University.

In 1975, Azerbaijan Civil Engineering Institute was established with the decision of Azerbaijan SSR Council of Ministers. The institute received the status of a university in 1992. After the decision made by Azerbaijani President Heydar Aliyev on June 13, 2000, the name of the university became Azerbaijan University of Architecture and Construction.

General information 
The staff of 700 professors and teachers prepare engineer specialists. Out of 700, 100 are Doctors of Sciences, more than 400 are candidate of sciences, senior lecturers and head teachers. Along with them, leading specialists of State Building Complex are also involved in the teaching process. The university has 42 departments. They are social-political, humanitarian, common sciences, technical and speciality departments. Financial and technical base of the university consolidates year by year. Most departments are equipped with modern facilities, computers and laboratories. Students have opportunities to spend quality time in leisure time. There are chess clubs, sports stadium, concert hall and cafes. The university publishes a newspaper which reflects the university life. University has also a modern library which contained 2 hall for rent books, 3 reading hall, architecture cabinet and foreign students cabinet. Library equipped with 3m technology.

International relations 
The University's international relations are carried out through the following structures;

 Deanery of foreign students
 Faculties for preparing foreign students
 International Relations Department

Deanery of Foreign Students has been operating since 1977 and aim to prepare specialists for foreign countries. Over the past period, about 1000 students from more than 40 countries have graduated from university. Currently, there are approximately 400 students and aspirants from 15 countries of the world are studying at the university.

Foreign citizens studying at AUAC are placed in the dormitory. The deanery of foreign students contact with relevant departments of foreign universities and other organizations. There are 65 instructors involved in tuition of foreign citizens.

Within the faculty exchange program the university collaborates with the universities of Algeria, Tunisia, Mali, Senegal, Guinea, Iran, Japan, Yemen, England, Afghanistan, Cambodia, India, Ethiopia, Turkey etc.).

The Faculty of Architecture of Azerbaijan University of Architecture and Construction has received the 5-year accreditation (Part 1) of the Royal Institute of British Architects (RIBA), known worldwide in the field of Architecture.

Collaborating universities 
Azerbaijan University of Architecture and Construction is collaborating with various universities from different countries such as Russia, Kazakhstan, Uzbekistan, Georgia, Ukraine, South Korea, Iran, Turkey, Egypt, Italy, England, Austria, France, Estonia, Czech Republic, Spain, Poland, Belgium and so on.

Majors 

 Construction Economics and its management
 Management (Construction)
 Marketing (Construction)
 Architecture
 Design of architectural environment 
 Restoration and reconstruction of architectural monuments
 Garden, park and landscape construction
 Industrial and civil construction
 Hydraulic construction
 Municipal construction and its operation
 Construction of melioration engineering systems
 Heating gas supply and ventilation
 Water supply and irrigation
 Railway construction and its operation
 Construction of motorways and airports
 Bridges and transport tunnels
 Production technology on building materials, products and construction
 Woodworking technology
 Technology of refractory, non-metallic and silicate materials
 The application geodesy
 Electrical supply of industrial enterprises of construction and construction materials.
 Automation of technological processes and production in construction.
 Construction, road machinery and equipment
 Machinery and equipment for building materials and construction industry
 Physics of Material (Construction)
 Material Science and New Materials Technology (Construction)
 Mechanization and automation (construction)
 Mechanization of construction works of hydraulic engineering systems
 Life Safety (Construction)
 Water resources protection and complex utilization

Affiliations
The university is a member of the Caucasus University Association.

References

External links 
 

 
1975 establishments in the Soviet Union
Universities and institutes established in the Soviet Union
Science and technology in Azerbaijan
Educational institutions established in 1975
1975 establishments in Azerbaijan